Timothy Leon Ross (born December 27, 1958) is a former American football linebacker who played for the Detroit Lions of the National Football League (NFL). He played college football at Bowling Green State University.

References 

Bowling Green Falcons football players
American football linebackers
Detroit Lions players
1958 births
Living people